Tropical and subtropical coniferous forests are a tropical forest habitat type defined by the World Wide Fund for Nature. These forests are found predominantly in North and Central America and experience low levels of precipitation and moderate variability in temperature. Tropical and subtropical coniferous forests are characterized by diverse species of conifers, whose needles are adapted to deal with the variable climatic conditions. Most tropical and subtropical coniferous forest ecoregions are found in the Nearctic and Neotropical realms, from the Mid-Atlantic states to Nicaragua and on the Greater Antilles, Bahamas, and Bermuda. Other tropical and subtropical coniferous forests ecoregions occur in Asia. Mexico harbors the world's richest and most complex subtropical coniferous forests. The conifer forests of the Greater Antilles contain many endemics and relictual taxa. 

Many migratory birds and butterflies spend winter in tropical and subtropical conifer forests. This biome features a thick, closed canopy which blocks light to the floor and allows little underbrush. As a result, the ground is often covered with fungi and ferns. Shrubs and small trees compose a diverse understory.

Tropical and subtropical coniferous forests ecoregions

See also 
Forest 
Trees of the world
Arid Forest Research Institute (AFRI)

References

 
Terrestrial biomes
Conifers
Forests